Kanungu is a town in the Western Region of Uganda. It is the location of the district headquarters for Kanungu District.

Location
The coordinates of the town are 0°53'49.0"S, 29°46'32.0"E (Latitude:-0.896950; Longitude:29.775556).

Population
The 2014 national population census enumerated the population of Kanungu town at 15,056 inhabitants, with a projected population of 16,300 in July 2019.

Points of interest
The following additional points of interest lie within Kanungu or near its borders: (a) the offices of Kanungu Town Council (b) Kanungu central market (c) a branch of PostBank Uganda (d) Kanungu Power Station, a 6.6 megawatt hydroelectric power station, also referred to as the "Ishasha Power Station".

Kanungu Town Council is connected to the national electricity grid, and is serviced by National Water and Sewerage Corporation.

Challenges
Some of the challenges that the town faces, include poor sanitation and insufficient number of public trash bins. The town also lacks sufficient number of public toilets. The few that are available are described as "very dirty". Domestic animals, including cows and goats are allowed to wander freely in town. Other concerns include the absence of street lights and noise pollution.

See also
Kigezi
List of cities and towns in Uganda
Rukungiri–Kihihi–Ishasha–Kanungu Road

References

External links
About Kanungu District
Map of Kanungu Town Council And Neighborhood

Cities in the Great Rift Valley
Kanungu District
Kigezi sub-region
Populated places in Western Region, Uganda